Radio Mali is an album by Ali Farka Touré, consisting of remastered selections from several earlier albums originally recorded between 1975 and 1980.

Track listing
 "Njarka" – 0:43
 "Yer Mali Gakoyoyo" – 4:47
 "Soko" – 5:06
 "Bandalabourou" – 6:41
 "Machengoidi" – 2:41
 "Samariya" – 5:27
 "Hani" – 4:20
 "Gambari" – 6:24
 "(Njarka) Gambari" – 3:21
 "Biennal" – 5:09
 "Arsani" – 5:16
 "Amadinin" – 7:08
 "Seygalare" – 5:10
 "Terei Kongo" – 6:08
 "Radio Mali" – 2:43
 "Njarka" – 1:02

Personnel
 Ali Farka Touré - Vocals 2-12,14-15; Guitar 1-16; Percussion 7
 Bra Nabo - n'jarka violin 1,5,16
 Nassourou Sare - n'goni 3-4,8,11,13
 Fangha - n'jarka violin 5,9
 (unknown) (Chorus 6; Percussion 6, n'goni 6

References 
 Radio Mali

1996 albums
Ali Farka Touré albums
World Circuit (record label) albums